Terrace is a ghost town in the Great Salt Lake Desert in west-central Box Elder County, Utah, United States.

Description

The town was established April 1, 1869, as a Central Pacific Railroad "division point" (operations base), on the route of the First transcontinental railroad and included a 16-stall roundhouse and an eight-track switchyard. Terrace was dependent on the railroad throughout its history.  The town may have had 1,000 people at peak, including a sizeable population of Chinese railway construction workers.

The former town (as well as the nearby Terrace Mountain) was named for the shoreline terraces of the former Lake Bonneville in the area.

History
In 1904 the Southern Pacific Railroad, successor to the Central Pacific, completed the Lucin Cutoff across the Great Salt Lake. The new route bypassed Terrace, and the tracks through town became a little-used branchline. The railroad line through Terrace was finally abandoned in 1942. Many of Terrace's houses and buildings were moved to Montello. The cemetery still remains with only three headstones, and only a pile of red bricks and the outline of the turntable is next to the old railroad bed.

The tracks along the grade were removed in 1942. The grade was added to the National Register of Historic Places in 1987, as part of the Central Pacific Railroad Grade Historic District. In 1993 the Bureau of Land Management designated the grade as part of the  Transcontinental Railroad Back Country Byway.

See also

 List of ghost towns in Utah
 Central Pacific Railroad Grade Historic District

References

Additional reading

External links

Ghost towns in Box Elder County, Utah
Populated places established in 1869
1869 establishments in Utah Territory
Ghost towns in Utah